A standard language (also standard variety, standard dialect, and standard) is a language variety that has undergone substantial codification of grammar and usage, although occasionally the term refers to the entirety of a language that includes a standardized form as one of its varieties. Typically, the language varieties that undergo substantive standardization are the dialects associated with centers of commerce and government. By processes that linguistic anthropologists call "referential displacement" and that sociolinguists call "elaboration of function", these varieties acquire the social prestige associated with commerce and government. As a sociological effect of these processes, most users of this language come to believe that the standard language is inherently superior or consider it the linguistic baseline against which to judge other varieties of language.

The standardization of a language is a continual process, because a language-in-use cannot be permanently standardized like the parts of a machine. Typically, standardization processes include efforts to stabilize the spelling of the prestige dialect, to codify usages and particular (denotative) meanings through formal grammars and dictionaries, and to encourage public acceptance of the codifications as intrinsically correct. In that vein, a pluricentric language has interacting standard varieties; examples are English, French, and Portuguese, German, Korean, and Serbo-Croatian, Spanish and Swedish, Armenian and Mandarin Chinese; whereas monocentric languages, such as Russian and Japanese, have one standardized idiom.

In Europe, a standardized written language is sometimes identified with the German word Schriftsprache (written language). The term literary language is occasionally used as a synonym for standard language, a naming convention still prevalent in the linguistic traditions of eastern Europe. In contemporary linguistic usage, the terms standard dialect and standard variety are neutral synonyms for the term standard language, usages which indicate that the standard language is one of many dialects and varieties of a language, rather than the totality of the language, whilst minimizing the negative implication of social subordination that the standard is the only idiom worthy of the appellation "language".

Linguistic standardization 
The term standard language identifies a repertoire of broadly recognizable conventions in spoken and written communications used in a society; the term implies neither a socially ideal idiom nor a culturally superior form of speech. These conventions develop from related dialects, usually by social action (ethnic and cultural unification) that elevate discourse patterns associated with perceived centers of culture, or more rarely, by deliberately defining the norms of standard language with selected linguistic features drawn from the existing dialects, as in the case of Modern Hebrew. 

Either course of events typically results in a relatively fixed orthography codified in grammars and normative dictionaries, in which users can also sometimes find illustrative examples drawn from literary, legal, or religious texts. Whether grammars and dictionaries are created by the state or by private citizens (e.g. Webster's Dictionary), some users regard such linguistic codifications as authoritative for correcting the spoken and written forms of the language. Effects of such codifications include slowing the pace of diachronic change in the standardized variety and affording a basis for further linguistic development (Ausbau). In the practices of broadcasting and of official communications, the standard usually functions as a normalizing reference for speech and writing. In educational contexts, it usually informs the version of the language taught to non-native learners.

In those ways, the standard variety acquires social prestige and greater functional importance than nonstandard dialects, which depend upon or are heteronomous with respect to the standard idiom. Standard usage serves as the linguistic authority, as in the case of specialist terminology; moreover, the standardization of spoken forms is oriented towards the codified standard. Historically, a standard language arises in two ways: (i) in the case of Standard English, linguistic standardization occurs informally and piecemeal, without formal government intervention; (ii) in the cases of the French and Spanish languages, linguistic standardization occurs formally, directed by prescriptive language institutions, such as the Académie Française and the Royal Spanish Academy, which respectively produce Le bon français and El buen español.

A standard variety can be conceptualized in two ways: (i) as the sociolect of a given socio-economic stratum or (ii) as the normative codification of a dialect, an idealized abstraction. Hence, the full standardization of a language is impractical, because a standardized dialect cannot fully function as a real entity, but does function as set of linguistic norms observed to varying degrees in the course of usus – of how people actually speak and write the language. In practice, the language varieties identified as standard are neither uniform nor fully stabilized, especially in their spoken forms. From that perspective, the linguist Suzanne Romaine says that standard languages can be conceptually compared to the imagined communities of nation and nationalism, as described by the political scientist Benedict Anderson, which indicates that linguistic standardization is the result of a society's history and sociology, and thus is not a universal phenomenon; of the approximately 7,000 contemporary spoken languages, most do not have a codified standard dialect.

Politically, in the formation of a nation-state, identifying and cultivating a standard variety can serve efforts to establish a shared culture among the social and economic groups who compose the new nation-state. Different national standards, derived from a continuum of dialects, might be treated as discrete languages (along with heteronomous vernacular dialects) even if there are mutually intelligible varieties among them, such as the North Germanic languages of Scandinavia (Danish, Norwegian, and Swedish). Moreover, in political praxis, either a government or a neighboring population might deny the cultural status of a standard language. In response to such political interference, linguists develop a standard variety from elements of the different dialects used by a society.

For example, when Norway became independent from Denmark in 1814, the only written language was Danish. Different Norwegian dialects were spoken in rural districts and provincial cities, but people with higher education and upper-class urban people spoke ″Danish with a Norwegian pronunciation". Based upon the bourgeois speech of the capital Oslo (Christiania) and other major cities, several orthographic reforms, notably in 1907 and 1917, resulted in the official standard Riksmål, in 1929 renamed Bokmål ('book tongue'). The philologist Ivar Aasen (1813–1896) considered urban and upper-class Dano-Norwegian too similar to Danish, so he developed Landsmål ('country tongue'), the standard based upon the dialects of western Norway. In 1885 the Storting (parliament) declared both forms official and equal. In 1929 it was officially renamed Nynorsk (New Norwegian).

Likewise, in Yugoslavia (1945–1992), when the Socialist Republic of Macedonia (1963–1991) developed their national language from the dialect continuum demarcated by Serbia to the north and Bulgaria to the east, their Standard Macedonian was based upon vernaculars from the west of the republic, which were the dialects most linguistically different from standard Bulgarian, the previous linguistic norm used in that region of the Balkan peninsula. Although Macedonian functions as the standard language of the Republic of North Macedonia, nonetheless, for political and cultural reasons, Bulgarians treat Macedonian as a Bulgarian dialect.

Examples

Chinese
Chinese consists of hundreds of local varieties, many of which are not mutually intelligible, usually classified into seven to ten major groups, including Mandarin, Wu, Yue, Hakka and Min.
Before the 20th century, most Chinese spoke only their local variety.
For two millennia, formal writing had been done in Literary Chinese (or Classical Chinese), a style modelled on the classics and far removed from any contemporary speech.
As a practical measure, officials of the late imperial dynasties carried out the administration of the empire using a common language based on Mandarin varieties, known as Guānhuà (literally "speech of officials").

In the early 20th century, many Chinese intellectuals argued that the country needed a standardized language.
By the 1920s, Literary Chinese had been replaced as the written standard by written vernacular Chinese, which was based on Mandarin dialects.
In the 1930s, Standard Chinese was adopted, with its pronunciation based on the Beijing dialect, but with vocabulary also drawn from other Mandarin varieties and its syntax based on the written vernacular.
It is the official spoken language of the People's Republic of China (where it is called Pǔtōnghuà "common speech"), the de facto official language of the Republic of China governing Taiwan (as Guóyǔ "national language") and one of the official languages of Singapore (as Huáyǔ "Chinese language").
Standard Chinese now dominates public life, and is much more widely studied than any other variety of Chinese.

English in the United Kingdom

In the United Kingdom, the standard language is British English, which is based upon the language of the mediaeval court of Chancery of England and Wales. In the late-seventeenth and early eighteenth centuries, Standard English became established as the linguistic norm of the upper class, composed of the peerage and the gentry. Socially, the accent of the spoken version of the standard language then indicated that the speaker was a man or a woman possessed of a good education, and thus of high social prestige. In England and Wales, Standard English is usually associated with Received Pronunciation, "the standard accent of English as spoken in the south of England.", but it may also be spoken with other accents, and in other countries still other accents are used (Australian, Canadian, American, etc.)

Greek
The standard form of Modern Greek is based on the Southern dialects; these dialects are spoken mainly in the Peloponnese, the Ionian Islands, Attica, Crete and the Cyclades.

Hindi-Urdu
Two standardised registers of the Hindustani language have legal status in India: Standard Hindi (one of 23 co-official national languages) and Urdu (Pakistan’s official tongue), resultantly, Hindustani often called "Hindi-Urdu".

Irish

An Caighdeán Oifigiúil ('The Official Standard'), often shortened to An Caighdeán, is the official standard of the Irish language. It was first published by the translators in Dáil Éireann in the 1950s. As of September 2013, the first major revision of the Caighdeán Oifigiúil is available, both online and in print. Among the changes to be found in the revised version are, for example, various attempts to bring the recommendations of the Caighdeán closer to the spoken dialect of Gaeltacht speakers, including allowing further use of the nominative case where the genitive would historically have been found.

Italian
Standard Italian is derived from the Tuscan dialect, specifically from its Florentine variety—the Florentine influence upon early Italian literature established that dialect as base for the standard language of Italy. In particular, Italian became the language of culture for all the people of Italy, thanks to the prestige of the masterpieces of Florentine authors like Dante Alighieri, as well as to the political and cultural significance of Florence at the time and the fact that it was linguistically an intermediate between the northern and the southern Italian dialects. It would later become the official language of all the Italian states, and after the Italian unification it became the national language of the Kingdom of Italy. Modern Standard Italian's lexicon has been deeply influenced by almost all regional languages of Italy.

Latin
The standard language in the Roman Republic (509 BC – 27 BC) and the Roman Empire (27 BC – AD 1453) was Classical Latin, the literary dialect spoken by upper classes of Roman society, whilst Vulgar Latin was the sociolect (colloquial language) spoken by the educated and uneducated peoples of the middle and the lower social classes of Roman society. The Latin language that Roman armies introduced to Gaul, Hispania, and Dacia was of a different grammar, syntax, and vocabulary than the Classical Latin spoken and written by the statesman Cicero.

Portuguese

In Brazil, actors and journalists usually adopt an unofficial, but de facto, spoken standard Portuguese, originally derived from the middle-class dialects of Rio de Janeiro and Brasília, but that now encompasses educated urban pronunciations from the different speech communities in the southeast. In that standard,  represents the phoneme  when it appears at the end of a syllable (whereas in Rio de Janeiro this represents ) and the rhotic consonant spelled  is pronounced  in the same situation (whereas in São Paulo this is usually an alveolar flap or trill).

Serbo-Croatian
Four standard variants of the pluricentric Serbo-Croatian are spoken in Bosnia and Herzegovina, Croatia, Montenegro, and Serbia. They all have the same dialect basis (Štokavian). These variants do differ slightly, as is the case with other pluricentric languages, but not to a degree that would justify considering them as different languages. The differences between the variants do not hinder mutual intelligibility and do not undermine the integrity of the system as a whole. Compared to the differences between the variants of English, German, French, Spanish, or Portuguese, the distinctions between the variants of Serbo-Croatian are less significant. Serbia, Croatia, Bosnia and Herzegovina, and Montenegro in their constitution have all named the language differently.

Somali
In Somalia, Northern Somali (or North-Central Somali) forms the basis for Standard Somali, particularly the Mudug dialect of the northern Darod clan. Northern Central Somali has frequently been used by famous Somali poets as well as the political elite, and thus has the most prestige among other Somali dialects.

See also

 Classical language
 Koiné language
 Language secessionism
 Literary language
 National language
 Nonstandard dialect
 Official language
 Vernacular

References

Bibliography

Further reading

 
 
 

 
Language
Language varieties and styles

Diglossia
Dialectology
Sociolinguistics
Linguistics terminology